Hemmatabad (also Romanized as Hemmatābād) is a village in Hemmatabad Rural District, in the Central District of Borujerd County, Lorestan Province, Iran. At the 2006 census, its population was 692, in 177 families.

References 

Towns and villages in Borujerd County